Professor Kulamani Parida, also known as K. M. Parida (born 9 May 1952) is an Indian chemical science professor and scientist best known for his work and research, mainly on material chemistry. He has won 16 state and national level scientific awards, and authored around 425 research articles, and seven book chapters. Parida has also 35 national scientific patents. Parida has also an outstanding google scholar citation index with citations of ~19279, h-index ~73, and i10-index ~335.

Early life and education 
Born and brought up in Kendrapara district of Odisha, Parida completed his schooling in Jayaram High school of Karilopatna (1969) and bachelor's degree in Chemistry from Kendapara Autonomous College. After completion of master's degree from Berhempur University, Parida joined as Research scholar in Regional Research Laboratory. During this period Parida married his colleague Ms. Renubala Parida.

Scientific career
In his early research career, Parida has served as materials chemistry scientist in various departments of Institute of Minerals and Materials Technology Bhubaneswar (Previously known as Regional Research Laboratory, Bhubaneswar), Where he retired as Chief Scientist on 31.05.2014. Currently Parida is serving as Professor in chemistry and Director of Centre for Nano Science and Nano Technology department of Siksha 'O' Anusandhan  University, Bhubaneswar. Parida also has served as active board member of scientific journals like “The Open Catalysis Journal” and “Bulletin of the Catalysis Society of India”.

Scientific contribution
Parida has made significant scientific input towards discovery of the chemistry related to physicochemical, opto-electronic and photoelectrochemical properties of semiconducting materials for efficient visible photon induced water redox reaction, pollutant abatement and fine chemical synthesis. His research towards architectural development of advance systems with remarkable charge separation, photocurrent and conversion efficiency is exceptional.

Awards and honours
Parida has received scientific awards and honours including

 MRSI Annual Prizes award (2022),
 Prof. S. K. Bhattacharyya Endoment Eminent Scientist Award (2017),
 Dai-Ichi Karkaria Endowment Fellowship (2014), 
 MRSI Medal (2013),
 Certificate of Excellence by IMMT (2010), 
 Ukieri Research Award (2009),
 SGAT Award of Excellence (2007), 
 Metallurgist of the Year Award (2004),
 Nilamani Devi-Bishwanath Das Award (2003),
 Samanta Chandra Sekhar Award (2001),
 Prof. Dayanidhi Pattnaik Award (1998),
 Ferroguard Award (1985–86).

Parida also received an award, the Biju Patnaik Award for Scientific Excellence (2008) from Odisha Bigyan Academy and received a Senior DAAD Fellowship (1999), INSA Fellowship (2000 & 2010)  and Royal Society Fellowship (2004 and 2008).

References

Indian scientists
1952 births
Living people
People from Kendrapara district
Berhampur University